Jadran Barut (born 30 December 1940 in Izola) is a Slovenian rower who competed for Yugoslavia in the men's eight at the 1964 Summer Olympics.

References

External links 
 
 
 

1940 births
Living people
Yugoslav male rowers
Slovenian male rowers
People from Izola
Rowers at the 1964 Summer Olympics
Olympic rowers of Yugoslavia
European Rowing Championships medalists